Vale Of Lune Rugby Union Football Club is an English rugby union club based in Lancaster. The first team currently plays in North 1 West, a level six league in the English league system, following the club's relegation from North Premier at the end of the 2018-19 season. Herbert Storey, a High Sheriff of Lancashire, was among those who founded the club.

Club Honours
Lancashire Cup winners (2): 1986, 1992
North 1 West champions (2): 2002-03, 2017–18
North Lancashire/Cumbria v South Lancs/Cheshire 1 promotion playoff winners: 2008-09

References

External links
Official website

English rugby union teams
1900 establishments in England
Rugby clubs established in 1900
Sport in Lancaster, Lancashire
Rugby union in Lancashire